Ganto may refer to:

Yantou Quanhuo (Chinese: 巖頭全豁; pinyin: Yántóu Quánhuō; Japanese Gānto Zenkatsu) (828–887), an ancient Ch'an master of Yantou Monastery in Ezhou, China
Sino Ganto (born 1987), South African rugby union player

See also
Gantos, an American women's specialty clothing retailer based in Grand Rapids, Michigan, USA
Jack Gantos (born 1951), American author of children's books